Jordan Daly is a Scottish campaigner and co founder of the Time for Inclusive Education (TIE) charity. His activity focuses mainly on homophobic bullying in schools and LGBT education. He was awarded LGBT Role Model of the Year at the 2017 Icon Awards, named as one of the "top ten biggest players in Scottish education" by TES magazine and Young Scot of the Year 2018 at the Young Scot Awards.

Background
Daly is gay and has spoken openly about mental health and his suicidal thoughts during his teenage years as a consequence of experiencing homophobia at school. He studied at the University of Glasgow.

TIE Activism
Daly and Liam Stevenson founded Time for Inclusive Education (known as the TIE campaign) in June 2015. They met and began their political activity during the Scottish independence referendum. The pair are credited with winning gains for the LGBT lobby in relation to education, including achieving the support of the Scottish Parliament for their cause and the creation of a Scottish Government LGBT education working group of which both are currently members. In 2018 the group proposed policy recommendations to the Scottish Government, all of which were accepted, making Scotland the first country in the world to include LGBT themes in the curriculum for all public schools. Daly and Stevenson publicly stated that their campaigning efforts had been successful.

References

Living people
Scottish activists
Scottish LGBT rights activists
Scottish gay men
Year of birth missing (living people)